Unfold is the third studio album by the Irish trance producer and DJ John O'Callaghan, released on April 7, 2011, as digital download and on April 15, 2011, in stores.

Track listing

External links
 Unfold at Armada Music
 John O'Callaghan official website

2011 albums
John O'Callaghan (musician) albums
Armada Music albums